Scopula donovani is a moth of the  family Geometridae. It is found in Morocco, Egypt, Kenya, Madagascar, Nigeria, South Africa and Uganda.

References

Moths described in 1892
donovani
Moths of Africa